Scouting for All is a 501(c)(3) non-profit organization American advocacy organization whose stated purpose is to promote tolerance and diversity within the Boy Scouts of America in the face of its policies requiring members to be heterosexuals who believe in God.

History
Initially founded in 1993 by Scouter Dave Rice and a committee including Mike Cahn, Bob Smith, Ken McPherson and Don Henry, Scouting for All was relatively inactive for its first few years.

In 1997, the effort was galvanized by a letter to the editor written by Steven Cozza, who later went on to earn the rank of Eagle Scout and became a professional bicycle racer. The heterosexual young man criticized the BSA's policies and pointed out potential contradictions between those policies and the organization's own governing Scout Oath and Scout Law. He called upon the organization to reexamine its policies and invited others in the organization who agreed with him to contact him so they could all work together to effect the desired policy changes. According to the organization's literature, Dave Rice, Steven Cozza and Steven's father, Scott Cozza were considered the co-founders of the Scouting for All.

After David Rice stepped down in the mid 2000s leadership passed through several individuals, until Howard Menzer took the position. The organization has been largely dormant since, with a small group of members but will little action. In 2012, Scouts For Equality, was founded by a group of straight Eagle Scouts, including Zach Wahls. Instead of SFA's strategy of direct protests, SFE lobbied the BSA's corporate partners and used petitions and succeeded in winning inclusion for gay youth in 2013. Scouting For All announced limited protests in the midst of that debate but those did not materialize and their role in the victory was minor if at all. SFE continues to work for inclusion for Gay adults, having merged with the Inclusive Scouting Network to be the lead organization today fighting the BSA's ban on gay adults.

The Inclusive Scouting Award / Scouting for All Rainbow Knot 

The Inclusive Scouting Award is also called the Rainbow Knot when distributed by Scouting for All, and expresses solidarity with Scouting For All's cause. It is an embroidered cloth patch that resembles the BSA's square knot insignia and is intended for wear above the left pocket of the uniform shirt. The emblem incorporates the purple and silver of the religious emblems knot and the colors of the Rainbow flag, representing both religious and sexual orientation discrimination and depicting the two issues as intertwined.

The knot was introduced in 2002 by the Inclusive Scouting Network (formerly the Coalitions for Inclusive Scouting) as the Inclusive Scouting Award, and later distributed by the now-defunct ScoutPride and Scouting for All. The knot is currently available through Scouts for Equality.

See also

Scouting for Equality
Scout's Honor

References

External links
Religious Tolerance's Page on the BSA
 Volokh, Eugene Freedom of Expressive Association and Government Subsidies. Stanford Law Review (UCLA) 58: 1919–1968.

Associations related to the Boy Scouts of America
501(c)(3) organizations